Anania fuscofulvalis is a moth in the family Crambidae. It was described by Hiroshi Yamanaka in 2000. It is found in Nepal.

References

Moths described in 2000
Pyraustinae
Moths of Asia